Stinchar Falls is a waterfall of Scotland. It is located on the Stinchar Burn, east of Barr in Ayrshire.

See also
Waterfalls of Scotland

References

Waterfalls of South Ayrshire